The Ballad of the Red Shoes is a self-released extended play. It is a collaborative project between Andrew Bird and his mother, Beth Bird, who is a printmaker. In its original printing in 2001, the artwork consisted of an accordion-folded set of prints illustrating a story tucked inside a sturdy printed / handpainted chipboard folder. The new package is slightly less deluxe, the artwork is now in a booklet instead of an accordion fold—otherwise, all of the images remain the same. The CD contains 12 minutes' worth of instrumental violin pieces.

Track listing

References

External links
Pitchfork Media news of re-issue (January 5, 2006)

Andrew Bird albums
2002 EPs
Self-released EPs